Emmett Brennan (born 4 May 1991) is an Irish boxer. He competed in the men's light heavyweight event at the 2020 Summer Olympics.

References

External links
 

1991 births
Living people
Irish male boxers
Olympic boxers of Ireland
Boxers at the 2020 Summer Olympics
Place of birth missing (living people)